Christopher Thomas Binns (born 1970) is a British comedian, best known for his character Hospital Radio DJ Ivan Brackenbury.

Career
Binns was nominated at the Edinburgh Festival for the Edinburgh Comedy Award 2007 for his hospital radio DJ character Ivan Brackenbury. He has been twice nominated for the Adelaide Fringe Comedy Award, in 2010 and 2011. He was voted a Foster's Comedy God in 2010. He also was nominated for a Chortle Award in 2011 and was also named in a list of their 50 Most Memorable Gigs of the decade. He won the Best International Act at the 2013 New Zealand International Comedy Festival and was nominated for Best Comedy Show at FringeWorld, Perth in 2015 and 2016.

He appears in the BBC MI5 drama Spooks (Episode 6 Series 6), Series 3 of the IT Crowd on Channel 4, and, in character as Ivan Brackenbury, on The Jason Byrne Show and Knowing Me Knowing Yule with Alan Partridge.

As Ian D Montfort he had a BBC Radio 2 series called Ian D Montfort is Unbelievable, broadcast in February 2013. and appeared in the comedy movie Eaten by Lions in 2017.

Besides writing comedy for television and radio, Binns has appeared on other television shows, such as RI:SE, Bullrun, Oblivion and as a writer on Trigger Happy TV, for which he earned "best comedy moment" and "TV moment of 2001" awards. His first television appearances were Friday Night Armistice (BBC2) and Lee and Herring's Fist of Fun, and has gone on to further appear in the Channel 4-based late night sports talk show Under the Moon, with Danny Kelly and stage appearances at the Bloomsbury Theatre and Garrick Theatre.

Binns has worked on Radio 1, Virgin, BRMB and GLR, Talksport UK, Hallam FM and Key 103, appearing either as himself or as hospital radio character Ivan Brackenbury.

Binns is the co-writer of BBC 1's Hospital People, part of the BBC's Comedy Playhouse, in which he plays the five lead characters Ivan Brackenbury, Ian D Montfort, Susan Mitchell, Terry Boyle and Father Kenny.

He has written the book How to Get Famous - A Cynical Guide.

Controversies

In 1999, London-based radio station Xfm was fined £50,000 by the Radio Authority following complaints regarding the use of coarse sexual innuendo when discussing a bestial pornography video with a listener during the Tom Binns Breakfast Show. Parent company Capital Radio decided not to sack Binns but in a meeting shortly after the fine was issued, the Radio Authority made it clear to Capital Radio that this would negatively affect the decision to renew the XFM licence.

In December 2009, Binns was fired from BRMB by its owners Orion Media after he cut short the Queen's Christmas Message. The Message was played into his show in error instead of the expected two-minute news bulletin. Binns joked, "Two words: bore-ring". He then went on to joke that the British monarchy can't be as good for tourism as some people claim because "the French executed theirs and people still visit France" and played a George Michael record with the link "from one queen to another".

Binns admitted five counts of making and one of possessing indecent images of children when he appeared in court on 21 November 2022.

Filmography

Film
 2017: Eaten by Lions

Television
 Knowing Me, Knowing You... with Alan Partridge BBC2
 Lee and Herring's Fist of Fun BBC2
 The IT Crowd Channel 4
 Spooks BBC1
 Spicks and Specks ABC1
 Crossroads ITV1
 Under the Moon Channel 4
 RI:SE Channel 4
 Whitbread Race Coverage BBC2
 Saturday Night Armistice BBC2
 The Bull Run Channel 5
 Tom Binns Munchies Channel 5
 Hospital People BBC1
 8 Out of 10 Cats Does Countdown Channel 4

Live shows 

 2007: Ivan Brackenbury's Hospital Radio Roadshow
 2008: Ivan Brackenbury's Christmas Show
 2009: Ivan Brackenbury's Disease Hour
 2010: Ivan Brackenbury's Hospital Radio Remix
 2010: Ian D Montfort: Touching the Dead
 2011: Ian D Montfort: Spirit Comedium
 2012: Ian D Montfort: Unbelievable
 2012: Tom Binns does Ivan Brackenbury and others
 2013: Ian D Montfort: Psychic Fayre
2014: Ian D Montfort: Midday Seance
2014: Tom Binns has not been himself
2015: Ian D Montfort: Under Sciencey Conditions
2015: Tom Binns: The Club Sets

Radio
 Fist of Fun on BBC Radio 1
 Digital Update on BBC Radio 1
 The Ivan Brackenbury Show on BBC Radio 2
 The Jason Byrne Show on BBC Radio 2
 99p Challenge on BBC Radio 4
 Ian D Montfort is Unbelievable on BBC Radio 2

Awards and accolades
Binns has received several accolades:
 Melody Maker readers voted his show best of the year in 1999.
 More magazine readers voted him as the 25th sexiest man in the world 2002.
 Nominee for the Edinburgh Comedy Award at the Edinburgh Festival 2007
 Nominee for Best Established Comedian at the Adelaide Fringe 2010 and 2011
Voted Foster Comedy God in 2010 (Top Ten most popular Edinburgh Comedy Award Winners)
Chortle Award Nominee 2011 Best Character Comic
 Best International Act New Zealand International Comedy Festival 2013
Best Comedy Show Nomination 2014 and 2015
 Best Act award winner at the Midlands Comedy Awards 2015.

References

External links 
Official website

Living people
English television writers
British radio DJs
English radio personalities
British radio personalities
British radio comedy
English male radio actors
English male stage actors
English male television actors
1970 births
Male actors from Sheffield
British male television writers
Comedians from Yorkshire